Otto Karhi Park is a public park  in the Pokkinen district in the city centre of Oulu, Finland. The park has been named after Otto Karhi, a politician from Oulu.

References

External links 
 

Parks in Oulu
Pokkinen